Bakertown is an unincorporated community in Bertrand Township within Berrien County in the U.S. state of Michigan.

History
The name, sometimes written "Bakerstown", was after the Baker brother, proprietors of a 19th-century mill.

References

Unincorporated communities in Berrien County, Michigan